Walid Jallali (born 30 June 1978), also known as Oualid Jallali, is a Tunisian former professional tennis player.

Jallali spent his professional career primarily on the ITF Futures and satellite circuits, reaching a career best singles world ranking of 546. He won three singles and 12 doubles titles at Futures level.

From 1996 to 2008, Jallali participated in 40 Davis Cup ties for Tunisia and played 67 rubbers in total. In 2003, Tunisia returned to Group II after a 10-year absence and travelled to Hillerød to play Denmark, where he won the opening rubber of the tie, over Rasmus Nørby in five sets. By the time he retired he had amassed a team record 39 wins, of which 26 came in singles rubbers. His brother, Essam, also played Davis Cup tennis.

Jallali competed for Tunisia in three editions of the Mediterranean Games and was a doubles bronze medalist at the 2007 All-Africa Games, held in Algiers.

As a coach, Jallali had stints captaining Tunisia's Davis Cup team and has toured as the private coach of local players, including Ons Jabeur and Malek Jaziri.

References

External links
 
 
 

1978 births
Living people
Tunisian male tennis players
Competitors at the 2001 Mediterranean Games
Mediterranean Games competitors for Tunisia
African Games bronze medalists for Tunisia
African Games medalists in tennis
Competitors at the 2007 All-Africa Games
21st-century Tunisian people